Cossoidea is the superfamily of moths that includes carpenter moths and relatives. Like their likely sister group Sesioidea they are internal feeders and have spiny pupae with moveable segments to allow them to extrude out of their exit holes in stems and trunks during emergence of the adult (Edwards et al., 1999).

The Limacodidae are sometimes included here as a third family. But the Sesioidea, and perhaps the Zygaenoidea and/or Tortricoidea, seem to be close relatives of the Cossoidea, and the relation of these – in particular the Zygaenoidea – to the Limacodidae requires further study.

References
Edwards, E.D., Gentili, P., Horak, M., Kristensen, N.P. and Nielsen, E.S. (1999). The cossoid/sesioid assemblage. Ch. 11, pp. 181–185 in Kristensen, N.P. (Ed.). Lepidoptera, Moths and Butterflies. Volume 1: Evolution, Systematics, and Biogeography. Handbuch der Zoologie. Eine Naturgeschichte der Stämme des Tierreiches / Handbook of Zoology. A Natural History of the phyla of the Animal Kingdom. Band / Volume IV Arthropoda: Insecta Teilband / Part 35: 491 pp. Walter de Gruyter, Berlin, New York.

Sources
Firefly Encyclopedia of Insects and Spiders, edited by Christopher O'Toole, 2002

External links
TOL

 
Lepidoptera superfamilies